κ Gruis, Latinised as Kappa Gruis, is a solitary star in the southern constellation of Grus. With an apparent magnitude of 5.37, it is visible to the naked eye as a dim, orange-hued point. The distance to this system, as determined from an annual parallax shift of 8.87 mas as seen from the Earth, is roughly 368 light years. It is drifting further away with a heliocentric radial velocity of +18 km/s. It is a member of the Arcturus moving group.

This is an evolved K-type giant star on the asymptotic giant branch with a stellar classification of K5 III. With the supply of hydrogen at its core exhausted, it has expanded and now spans 29.6 times the radius of the Sun. It is radiating 200 times the Sun's luminosity from its enlarged photosphere at an effective temperature of 3,990 K.

References

K-type giants
Grus (constellation)
Gruis, Kappa
Durchmusterung objects
217902
113957
8774